Wilmslow Rugby Club is an English rugby union club based in Wilmslow, Cheshire. The first XV team currently plays in North 1 West, a level six league in the English rugby union system, following relegation from North Premier at the end of the 2018–19 season.

History
Wilmslow reached the national levels of the sport for the first time in 2018, obtaining promotion after winning the 2017-18 North 1 East/North 1 West promotion play-off. However this proved to be a step too far. The club finished bottom of the North Premier  and was immediately relegated back into North 1 West.

Club honours
Cheshire Cup winners: 1971–72
North West 2 champions: 1993–94
Cheshire Plate winners: 1994–95
South Lancs/Cheshire 1 champions (2): 2001–02, 2007–08
Cheshire Vase winners: 2014–15

References

External links
Official club website

English rugby union teams
Rugby union in Cheshire
Sports clubs in England
Wilmslow